Hans Frederick Koenekamp (December 3, 1891 – September 12, 1992) was an American special effects artist and cinematographer. He was nominated for an Oscar for Best Special Effects for the film Air Force (1943). He worked on more than 90 films during his career.

Cinematographer Fred J. Koenekamp (1922–2017) was his son.

Partial filmography

 Mabel's Strange Predicament (1914)
 Tillie's Punctured Romance (1914)
 The Stage Hand (1920)
 The Fall Guy (1921)
 The Bell Hop (1921)
 The Sawmill (1922)
 The Show (1922)
 The Agent (1922)
 No Wedding Bells (1923)
 The Girl in the Limousine (1924)
 Kid Speed (1924)
 The Wizard of Oz (1925)
 Stop, Look and Listen (1926)
 Spuds (1927)
 China Clipper (1936)
 Air Force (1943)
 Spencer's Mountain (1963)

See also
 List of centenarians (actors, filmmakers and entertainers)

References

External links

1891 births
1992 deaths
American cinematographers
Special effects people
People from Denison, Iowa
American centenarians
Men centenarians